Epiphora mythimnia, the white ringed Atlas moth, is a large saturniid moth native to Eastern Africa. The species was first described by John O. Westwood in 1849. With a 10–13 cm wingspan, it is one of the larger moths in Africa.

Description 
Much like other moths in its family, the white ringed Atlas moth has a relatively thick fuzzy body with lobed wings. Each lobe has a translucent eyespot surrounded by a white and yellow ring.

Range 
The species can be found in Botswana, Eswatini, Kenya, South Africa, Malawi , Mozambique, Zambia, and Zimbabwe.

References 

Moths described in 1849
Saturniinae